Habsburg Netherlands was the Renaissance period fiefs in the Low Countries held by the Holy Roman Empire's House of Habsburg. The rule began in 1482, when the last Valois-Burgundy ruler of the Netherlands, Mary, wife of Maximilian I of Austria, died. Their grandson, Emperor Charles V, was born in the Habsburg Netherlands and made Brussels one of his capitals. 

Becoming known as the Seventeen Provinces in 1549, they were held by the Spanish branch of the Habsburgs from 1556, known as the Spanish Netherlands from that time on. In 1581, in the midst of the Dutch Revolt, the Seven United Provinces seceded from the rest of this territory to form the Dutch Republic. The remaining Spanish Southern Netherlands became the Austrian Netherlands in 1714, after Austrian acquisition under the Treaty of Rastatt. De facto Habsburg rule ended with the annexation by the revolutionary French First Republic in 1795. Austria, however, did not relinquish its claim over the province until 1797 in the Treaty of Campo Formio.

Geography

The Habsburg Netherlands was a geo-political entity covering the whole of the Low Countries (i.e. the present-day Netherlands, Belgium, Luxembourg, and most of the modern French départements of Nord and Pas-de-Calais) from 1482 to 1581. The northern Low Countries began growing from 1200 CE, with the drainage and flood control of land, which could then be cultivated. The population rose and the region of Holland became important. Before that, the development of large cities was in the south, with Ghent, Bruges, Antwerp, Brussels, and Leuven, all of which were larger than any settlement in the north. Rivers in the Low Countries run east-west and were a political and strategic barrier to influence southern influence on the north, forming two separate political areas.

Already under the Holy Roman Empire rule of the Burgundian duke Philip the Good (1419–1467), the provinces of the Netherlands began to grow together, whereas previously they were split with being either the tributary of the French Kingdom or of Burgundy under the Holy Roman Empire banner. The collected fiefdoms were Flanders, Artois and Mechelen, Namur, Holland, Zeeland and Hainaut, Brabant, Limburg and Luxembourg were ruled in personal union by the Valois-Burgundy monarchs and represented in the States-General assembly. The centre of the Burgundian possessions was the Duchy of Brabant, where the Burgundian dukes held court in Brussels.

Philip's son Duke Charles the Bold (1467–1477) also acquired Guelders and Zutphen and even hoped for the royal title from the hands of the Habsburg emperor Frederick III by marrying their children Mary and Maximilian. Deeply disappointed, he entered into the disastrous Burgundian Wars and was killed in the Battle of Nancy.

History
Upon the death of Mary of Burgundy in 1482, her substantial possessions including the Burgundian Netherlands passed to her son, Philip (also known as Philip the Handsome), who married Joanna of Castile the daughter of Isabel I of Castile and Ferdinand II of Aragon, known as the Catholic Monarchs. Through his father Maximilian I, Holy Roman Emperor from 1493, Philip was a Habsburg scion, and so the period of the Habsburg Netherlands began. The period 1481–1492 saw the Flemish cities revolt and Utrecht embroiled in civil war, but by the turn of the century both areas had been pacified by the Austrian rulers.

Philip's son Charles, born in Ghent, succeeded his father in 1506, when he was just a six-year-old minor. His paternal grandfather, Emperor Maximilian I, incorporated the Burgundian heritage into the Burgundian Circle, whereafter the territories in the far west of the Empire developed a certain grade of autonomy. Through his mother Joanna of Castile, who had a mental breakdown following the death of her husband, he was heir to the Spanish kingdoms of Castile and Aragon and Spain's overseas empire in the New World. Attaining full age in 1515, Charles went on to rule his Burgundian heritage as a native Netherlander. He acquired the lands of Overijssel and the Bishopric of Utrecht (see Guelders Wars), purchased Friesland from Duke George of Saxony and regained Groningen and Gelderland. His Seventeen Provinces were re-organised in the 1548 Burgundian Treaty, whereby the Imperial estates represented in the Imperial Diet at Augsburg acknowledged a certain autonomy of the Netherlands. It was followed by a pragmatic sanction by the Emperor the next year, which established the Seventeen Provinces as an entity separate from the Empire and from France. 

Following a series of abdications between 1555 and 1556, Charles V divided the House of Habsburg into an Austrian-German and a Spanish branch. His brother Ferdinand I became suo jure monarch in Austria, Bohemia and Hungary, as well as the new Holy Roman Emperor. Philip II of Spain, Charles' son, inherited the Seventeen Provinces and incorporated them into the Spanish Crown (which included also south Italy and the American possessions). King Philip II of Spain became infamous for his despotism, and Catholic persecutions sparked the Dutch Revolt and the Eighty Years' War. The Spanish hold on the northern provinces was more and more tenuous. In 1579 the northern provinces established the Protestant Union of Utrecht, in which they declared themselves independent as the Seven United Provinces by the 1581 Act of Abjuration.

After the secession of 1581, the southern provinces, called "'t Hof van Brabant" (of Flandria, Artois, the Tournaisis, Cambrai, Luxembourg, Limburg, Hainaut, Namur, Mechelen, Brabant, and Upper Guelders) remained with the House of Habsburg until the French Revolutionary Wars. After the extinction of the Spanish Habsburg line in 1700 with the death of the childless Charles II and the War of the Spanish Succession (1700-14), the southern provinces were also known as the Austrian Netherlands from 1715 onwards.

Rulers
 1482–1506 Philip I of Castile as Duke of Burgundy, Maximilian I, his father, as regent (1482–1493), Margaret of York, his stepgrandmother, governess (1489–1493)
 1506–1556 Charles V as Duke of Burgundy, as Holy Roman Emperor from 1519.
 1556–1581 Philip II as King of Spain
The provinces were ruled on their behalf by a governor (stadtholder or landvoogd):
 1489–1493 Margaret of York, dowager Duchess of Burgundy
 1506–1507 William de Croÿ, Marquis d'Aerschot
 1507–1530 Margaret of Austria, Duchess of Savoy
 1531–1555 Mary of Hungary
 1555–1559 Emmanuel Philibert, Duke of Savoy
 1559–1567 Margaret of Parma
 1567–1573 Fernando Álvarez de Toledo, 3rd Duke of Alba
 1573–1576 Luis de Requesens y Zúñiga
 1576–1578 John of Austria
 1578–1592 Alexander Farnese, Duke of Parma

In 1578, the Dutch insurgents appointed Archduke Matthias of Austria governor, though he could not prevail and resigned before the 1581 Act of Abjuration.

See also
 Spanish Netherlands

References

 
History of the Low Countries
Former polities in the Netherlands
15th century in Belgium
 
 
 
States and territories established in 1482
1480s establishments in the Holy Roman Empire
1482 establishments in Europe